= Cevizlidere mine =

Copper mine in eastern Turkey

- Location within Turkey

Location
- Location: Tunceli Province, Turkey; 39°16′0.01″N 39°36′0″E

Production
- Products: Copper

The Cevizlidere mine is a large copper mine located in Tunceli Province in eastern Turkey. Cevizlidere represents one of the largest copper reserves in Turkey, with estimated reserves of 445.7 million tonnes of ore grading 0.38% copper.
